Canadian singer Celine Dion has recorded songs for 27 studio albums, including three Christmas albums, as well as eight greatest hits.

A 
 "À cause" (D'elles, 2007)
 "À la plus haute branche" (Encore Un Soir, 2016)
 "A Mother's Prayer" (Miracle, 2004)
 "A New Day Has Come" (A New Day Has Come, 2002)
 "A New Day Has Come" (Radio Remix) (A New Day Has Come, 2002)
 "A Paris" (500 choristes avec...., 2005)
 "A Song for You" (Taking Chances, 2007)
 "À vous" (Encore Un Soir, 2016)
 "A World to Believe In" (Taking Chances, 2007)
 "A World to Believe In" (U.S.A. Mix) (featuring Yuna Ito) (Complete Best, 2008)
 "A World to Believe In: Himiko Fantasia" ("A World to Believe In", 2008)
 "Adeste Fideles (O Come All Ye Faithful)" (These Are Special Times, 1998)
 "Ain't Gonna Look the Other Way" (A New Day... Live in Las Vegas, 2004)
 "All Because of You" (A New Day Has Come 2002 Limited Edition Bonus Track, 2002)
 "All by Myself" (Falling into You, 1996)
 "All the Way" (featuring Frank Sinatra) (All the Way... A Decade of Song, 1999)
 "Alone" (Taking Chances, 2007)
 "Always Be Your Girl" (Loved Me Back to Life, 2013)
 "Amar Haciendo el Amor" (Let's Talk About Love bonus track, 1997)
 "Ammore Annascunnuto" (Live) (Ultimate Box, 2008)
 "Another Year Has Gone By" (These Are Special Times, 1998)
 "Apprends-moi" (1 fille & 4 types, 2003)
 "At Last" (A New Day Has Come, 2002)
 "Ashes" (Deadpool 2 (Original Motion Picture Soundtrack), 2018)
 "At Seventeen" (Loved Me Back to Life, 2013)
 "Attendre" (Sans attendre, 2012)
 "Aun Existe Amor" (A New Day Has Come, 2002)
 "Ave Maria" (These Are Special Times, 1998)

B 
 "Baby" (Courage, 2019)
 "Baby Close Your Eyes" (Miracle, 2004)
 "Be the Man" (Let's Talk About Love bonus track, 1997) (Japanese and karaoke version on "Be the Man" single, 1997)
 "Beautiful Boy" (Miracle, 2004)
 "Beauty and the Beast" (featuring Peabo Bryson) (Celine Dion, 1992) / (featuring Maurice Davis, * "For Our Children : The Concert* ", 1992)
 "Because You Loved Me" (Falling into You, 1996)
 "Best of All" (Courage, 2019)
 "Berceuse" (D'elles, 2007)
 "Boundaries" (Courage. 2019)
 "Bewitched, Bothered and Bewildered" (Mona Lisa Smile Soundtrack)
 "Blue Christmas" (These Are Special Times, 1998)
 "Breakaway" (Loved Me Back to Life, 2013)
 "Brahms' Lullaby" (Miracle, 2004)

C 
 "Call the Man" (Falling into You, 1996)
 "Calling You" (Live) (À l'Olympia, 1994)
 "Can't Fight the Feelin'" (Taking Chances, 2007)
 "Can't Help Falling In Love" (VH1 Divas Las Vegas, 2002)
 "Can't Live With You, Can't Live Without You" (featuring Billy Newton-Davis) (Spellbound, 1989)
 "Celle qui m'a tout appris" (Sans attendre, 2012)
 "Change my Mind" (Courage, 2019)
 "Cherche encore" (D'eux, 1995)
 "Christmas Eve" (These Are Special Times, 1998)
 "Come To Me" (Miracle, 2004)
 "Come Together Now" (With Miscellaneous artists) (Come Together Now single, 2005)
 "Contre nature" (1 fille & 4 types, 2003)
 "Coulda Woulda Shoulda" (One Heart, 2003)
 "Cry Just A Little" (B-Side to Love Can Move Mountains single, 1992)
 "Comment t′aimer" (Les prèmiers années, 1986)
 "Courage" (Courage, 2019)

D 
 "Dance with My Father" (So Amazing: An All-Star Tribute to Luther Vandross, 2005 & My Love: Ultimate Essential Collection, 2008)
 "Dans un autre monde" (S'il suffisait d'aimer, 1998)
 "Declaration of Love" (Falling into You, 1996)
 "Des milliers de baisers" (1 fille & 4 types, 2003)
 "Des mots qui sonnent" (Dion chante Plamondon, 1991)
 "Destin" (D'eux, 1995)
 "Did You Give Enough Love" (Celine Dion, 1992)
 "Didn't Know Love" (Loved Me Back to Life, 2013)
 "Do You Hear What I Hear" (featuring Rosie O'Donnell) (These Are Special Times - Collectors Edition - DVD, 1998)
 "Don't Save It All for Christmas Day" (These Are Special Times, 1998)
 "Dreamin' of You" (Falling into You, 1996)
 "D'abord c'est quoi l'amour" (Incognito, 1988)

E 
 "Elle" (Live) (À l'Olympia, 1994)
 "En attendant ses pas" (S'il suffisait d'aimer, 1998)
 "Et je t'aime encore" (1 fille & 4 types, 2003)
 "Et s'il n'en restait qu'une (je serais celle-là)" (D'elles, 2007)
 "Everybody's Talkin' My Baby Down" (The Colour of My Love, 1993)
 "Eyes on Me" (Taking Chances, 2007)

F 
 "Fade Away" (Taking Chances, 2007)
 "Faith" (One Heart, 2003)
 "Falling In Love Again" (Courage, 2019)
 "Falling into You" (Falling into You, 1996)
 "Feliz Navidad" (These Are Special Times, 1998)
 "Femme comme chacune" (D'elles, 2007)
 "Fever" (Live) (A New Day... Live in Las Vegas, 2004)
 "Fly" (Falling into You, 1996)
 "Flying on My Own" (Courage, 2019)
 "Forget Me Not" (One Heart, 2003)
 "For the Lover That I Lost" (Courage, 2019)

G 
 "Goodbye's (The Saddest Word)" (A New Day Has Come, 2002)
 "God Bless America" (God Bless America, 2001)

H 
 "Halfway to Heaven" (Celine Dion, 1992)
 "Hand in Hand" ("Ne partez pas sans moi " German Single, 1988)
 "Happy To Meet You" (with Herry Monster, Elmo and Big Bird) (Elmopalooza! soundtrack, 1998)
 "Happy Xmas (War Is Over)" (These Are Special Times, 1998)
 "Have a Heart" (Unison, 1990)
 "Have You Ever Been in Love" (A New Day Has Come, 2002)
 "Heart of Glass" (Courage, 2019)
 "Here, There And Everywhere" (In My Life, 1998)
 "How Did You Get Here" (Courage, 2019)
 "How Does a Moment Last Forever" (Beauty and the Beast soundtrack, 2017)
 "How Do You Keep the Music Playing" (Loved Me Back to Life, 2013)
 "Hymn" (Snowtime! soundtrack, 2015)

I 
 "I Don't Know" (Falling into You, 1996)
 "I Drove All Night" (One Heart, 2003)
 "I Drove All Night" (Hex Hector Extended Vocal Import mix) (My Love: Ultimate Essential Collection bonus track, 2008)
 "I Feel Too Much" (Unison, 1990)
 "I Got Nothin' Left'" (Taking Chances, 2007)
 "I Hate You Then I Love You" (featuring Luciano Pavarotti) (Let's Talk About Love, 1997)
 "I Have to Dream" (Children on Their Birthdays soundtrack, 2002)
 "I Knew I Loved You" (We All Love Ennio Morricone, 2007 & My Love: Ultimate Essential Collection, 2008)
 "I Know What Love Is" (One Heart, 2003)
 "I Love You" (Falling into You, 1996)
 "I Love You, Goodbye" (Celine Dion, 1992)
 "I Met an Angel (On Christmas Day)" (Happy X-Mas (War is Over) & B-side of "That's The Way It Is" single, 1999)
 "I Remember L.A." (The Colour of My Love, 1993)
 "I Surrender" (A New Day Has Come, 2002)
 "I Want You to Need Me" (All the Way... A Decade of Song, 1999)
 "I Want You to Need Me" (Thunderpuss Radio mix) (My Love: Ultimate Essential Collection bonus track, 2008)
 "I Will Be Stronger" (Courage, 2019)
 "If I Can Dream" (featuring Elvis Presley (American Idol), 2007 & (The Best of Celine Dion & David Foster), 2012)
 "If I Could" (Miracle, 2004)
 "If I Ruled The World" (featuring Tony Bennett) (Duets: An American Classic, 2006)
 "If I Were You" (Celine Dion, 1992)
 "If Love Is out of the Question" (Unison, 1990)
 "If That's What It Takes" (Falling into You, 1996)
 "(If There Was) Any Other Way" (Unison, 1990)
 "If Walls Could Talk" (All the Way... A Decade of Song, 1999)
 "If We Could Start Over" (Unison, 1990)
 "If You Asked Me To" (Celine Dion, 1992)
 "If You Could See Me Now" (Celine Dion, 1992)
 "I'm Alive" (A New Day Has Come, 2002)
 "I'm Loving Every Moment with You" (Unison, 1990)
 "Imperfections" (Courage, 2019)
 "Immensité" (D'elles, 2007)
 "Immortality" (Let's Talk About Love, 1997)
 "I'm Your Angel" (featuring R. Kelly) (These Are Special Times, 1998)
 "Incredible" (featuring Ne-Yo) (Loved Me Back to Life, 2013)
 "In His Touch" (One Heart, 2003)
"incognito" (INCOGNITO, 1987)
 "In Some Small Way" (Miracle, 2004)
 "Introduction" (Celine Dion, 1992)
 "It's a Man's Man's Man's World" (Live) (Taking Chances World Tour: The Concert, 2010)
 "It's All Coming Back to Me Now" (Falling into You, 1996)
 "It's All Coming Back to Me Now" (Classic Paradise mix) (Falling into You bonus track, 1996)
 "It's Hard to Say Goodbye" (featuring Paul Anka) (A Body of Work, 1998) / (Different version: Duets, 2013)
 "I've Got the World on a String" (Live) (A New Day... Live in Las Vegas, 2004)
 "I Wish" (Live) (A New Day... Live in Las Vegas, 2004)

J 
 "Je chanterai" ([S'il suffisait d'aimer], 1998)
 "Je cherche l'ombre" (D'elles, 2007)
 "Je crois toi" (S'il suffisait d'aimer, 1998)
 "Je danse dans ma tête" (Dion chante Plamondon, 1991)
 "Je lui dirai" (1 fille & 4 types, 2003)
 "Je ne suis pas celle" (D'elles, 2007)
 "Je n'ai pas besoin d'amour" (Sans attendre, 2012)
 "Je nous veux" (Encore Un Soir, 2016)
 "Je sais pas" (D'eux, 1995)
 "Je t'aime encore" (One Heart, 2003)
 "Just a Little Bit of Love" (Let's Talk About Love, 1997)
 "Just Walk Away" (The Colour of My Love bonus track, 1993)
 "J'ai besoin d'un chum" (Dion chante Plamondon, 1991)
 "J'attendais" (D'eux, 1995)
 "J'irai où tu iras" (D'eux, 1995)
 "J'irai où tu iras" (Demo Version) (featuring Jean-Jacques Goldman) (D'eux 15th Anniversary Edition bonus track, 2010)

L 
 "L'abandon" (S'il suffisait d'aimer, 1998)
 "Là-bas" (featuring Jean-Jacques Goldman) (Les Enfoirés au Grand Rex, 1994)
 "La dodo la do" (Les chemins de ma maison, 1983)
 "La diva" (D'elles, 2007)
 "La mémoire d'Abraham" (D'eux, 1995)
 "La mer et l'enfant" (Sans attendre, 2012)
 "L'amour existe encore" (Dion chante Plamondon, 1991)
 "L'amour peut prendre froid" (featuring Johnny Hallyday) (Sans attendre, 2012)
 "La Religieuse" (single, 1988)
 "Le ballet" (D'eux, 1995)
 "Le ballet" (Demo Version) (D'eux 15th Anniversary Edition bonus track, 2010)
 "Le blues du businessman" (Dion chante Plamondon, 1991)
 "Le bonheur en face" (Encore Un Soir, 2016)
 "Le fils de Superman" (Dion chante Plamondon, 1991)
 "Le loup, la biche et le chevalier (Une chanson douce)" (Miracle, 2004)
 "Le miracle" (Sans attendre, 2012)
 "Le monde est stone" (Dion chante Plamondon, 1991)
 "Le temps qui compte" (D'elles, 2007)
 "L'étoile" (Encore Un Soir, 2016)
 "Le vieux monsieur de la rue Royale" (Tellement j'ai d'amour..., 1982)
 "Le vol d'un ange" (1 fille & 4 types, 2003)
 "Les chansons d'amour" (Medley) (La Soirée des Enfoirés 96, 1996)
 "Les cloches du hameau" (These Are Special Times, 1998)
 "Les derniers seront les premiers" (D'eux, 1995)
 "Les jours comme ça" (Sans attendre, 2012)
 "Les oiseaux du bonheur" (Les oiseaux du bonheur, 1984)
 "Les paradis" (D'elles, 2007)
 "Les petits pieds de Léa" (Sans attendre, 2012)
 "Les roses blanches" (La voix du bon Dieu, 1981)
 "Les uns contre les autres" (Dion chante Plamondon, 1991)
 "Les yeux au ciel" (Encore Un Soir, 2016)
 "Lettre de George Sand à Alfred de Musset" (D'elles, 2007)
 "Let's Talk About Love" (Let's Talk About Love, 1997)
 "Let Your Heart Decide" (Tous les secrets single, 2005 & Astérix & les Vikings soundtrack, 2006)
 "Little Bit of Love" (Celine Dion, 1992)
 "Live for the One I Love" (All the Way... A Decade of Song, 1999)
 "Look At Us Now" (Courage, 2019)
 "Love by Another Name" (Unison, 1990)
 "Love Can Move Mountains" (Celine Dion, 1992 & different version on Touched By An Angel The album, 1998)
 "Love Doesn't Ask Why" (The Colour of My Love, 1993)
 "Love Is All We Need" (One Heart, 2003)
 "Love Is on the Way" (Let's Talk About Love, 1997)
 "Love Lights the World" (With Miscellenaous artists) (For Our Children Too, 1996)
 "Lovers Never Die" (Courage, 2019)
 "Lovin' Proof" (The Colour of My Love, 1993)
 "Loved Me Back to Life" (Loved Me Back to Life, 2013)
 "Love You Blind" (B-side of "If You Asked Me To " single, 1992)
 "Lullabye (Goodnight, My Angel)" (Loved Me Back to Life, 2013)
 "Lying Down" (Courage, 2019)

M 
 "Ma Faille" (Encore Un Soir,2016)
 "Ma Force" (Encore Un Soir, 2016)
 "Ma nouvelle France" (Ma nouvelle France soundtrack, 2004)
 "Make You Happy" (Falling into You, 1996)
 "Map to My Heart" (Taking Chances bonus track, 2007)
 "Medley acoustique - Ce n'était qu'un rêve / D'amour ou d'amitié / Mon ami m'a quittée / L'amour existe encore / Ziggy" (Au coeur du stade, 1999)
 "Medley Starmania - Quand on arrive en ville / Les uns contre les autres / Le monde est stone / Naziland, ce soir on danse" (Live) (À l'Olympia, 1994)
 "Mejor Decir Adios" (featuring Paul Anka) (Amigos, 1996)
 "Miles to Go (Before I Sleep)" (Let's Talk About Love, 1997)
 "Miracle" (Miracle, 2004)
 "Misled" (The Colour of My Love, 1993)
 "Misled" (MK's History Remix) (My Love: Ultimate Essential Collection bonus track, 2008)
 "Moi quand je pleure" (Sans attendre, 2012)
 "Mon homme" (1 fille & 4 types, 2003)
 "My Heart Will Go On" (Let's Talk About Love, 1997)
 "My Heart Will Go On" (No lead vocals) (These Are Special Times bonus track, 1998)
 "My Heart Will Go On" (Richie Jones mix) (Let's Talk About Love bonus track, 1997)
 "My Heart Will Go On" (Tony Moran's Anthem Vocal mix) (My Love: Ultimate Essential Collection bonus track, 2008)
 "My Love" (Taking Chances, 2007)
 "My Love" (Live) (My Love: Essential Collection, 2008)
 "My Precious One" (Miracle, 2004)

N 
 "Nadie lo entiende" (featuring Café Quijano) (¡Qué Grande Es Esto del Amor!), 2003
 "Naked" (One Heart, 2003)
 "Nature Boy" (A New Day Has Come, 2002)
 "Ne bouge pas" (1 fille & 4 types, 2003)
 "Ne me quitte pas" (Sans attendre, 2012)
 "Ne partez pas sans moi" (Incognito, 1987)
 "New Dawn" (Taking Chances, 2007)
 "Next Plane Out" (The Colour of My Love, 1993)
 "No Living Without Loving You" (The Colour of My Love, 1993)
 "Nobody's Watching" (Courage, 2019)
 "Nothing Broken but My Heart" (Celine Dion, 1992)

O 
 "O Holy Night" (These Are Special Times, 1998)
 "On s'est aimé à cause" (D'elles, 2007)
 "One Heart" (One Heart, 2003)
 "Only One Road" (The Colour of My Love, 1993)
 "Open Arms" (Loved Me Back to Life) (Japanese Edition Bonus Track), 2013
 "Ordinaire" (Encore Un Soir, 2016)
 "Overjoyed" (featuring Stevie Wonder) (Loved Me Back to Life, 2013)
 "Oxygène" (Dion chante Plamondon, 1991)

P 
 "Papillon" (S'il suffisait d'aimer, 1998)
 "Parler à mon père" (Sans attendre, 2012)
 "Petit Papa Noël" (featuring The Chipmunks) (A Very Merry Chipmunk, 1994)
 "Piaf chanterait du rock" (Dion chante Plamondon, 1991)
 "Plus Haut Que Moi" (featuring Mario Pelchat (Pelchat, 1993)
 "Plus Qu'ailleurs (Encore Un Soir, 2016)
 "Pour que tu m'aimes encore" (D'eux, 1995)
 "Pour que tu m'aimes encore" (Demo Version) (D'eux 15th Anniversary Edition bonus track, 2010)
 "Prayer" (A New Day Has Come, 2002)
 "Prière païenne" (D'eux, 1995)

Q 
 "Quand on n'a que l'amour" (À l'Olympia, 1994) / (featuring Maurane, La Soirée des Enfoirés 96, 1996)
 "Quand on s'aime" (featuring René Simard) (Hier... encore, 2003)
 "Que toi au monde" (Sans attendre, 2012)
 "Quelqu'un que j'aime, quelqu'un qui m'aime" (Dion chante Plamondon, 1991)
 "Qui peut vivre sans amour ?" (Sans attendre, 2012)

R 
 "Rain, Tax (It's Inevitable)" (A New Day Has Come, 2002)
 "Real Emotion" (The Colour of My Love, 1993)
 "Refuse to Dance" (The Colour of My Love, 1993)
 "Regarde-moi" (D'eux, 1995)
 "Retiens-moi" (1 fille & 4 types, 2003)
 "Reveal" (One Heart, 2003)
 "Rien n'est vraiment fini" (1 fille & 4 types, 2003)
 "Right in Front of You" (A New Day Has Come, 2002)
 "Right Next to the Right One" (Taking Chances, 2007)
 "River Deep, Mountain High" (Falling into You, 1996)

S 
 "Save Your Soul" (Loved Me Back to Life, 2013)
 "Say Yes" (Courage, 2019) 
 "Seduces Me" (Falling into You, 1996)
 "Send Me A Lover (In Between Dances, 1994)
 "Shadow of Love" (Taking Chances, 2007)
 "Show Some Emotion" (Celine Dion, 1992)
 "Si c'était à refaire" (Encore Un Soir, 2016)
 "Si Dieu existe" (featuring Claude Dubois) (Duos Dubois, 2010)
 "Si je n'ai rien de toi" (Sans attendre, 2012)
 "Si j'étais quelqu'un" (D'elles, 2007)
 "Skies of L.A." (Taking Chances, 2007)
 "Sleep Tight" (Miracle, 2004)
 "Sola Otra Vez" (Falling into You bonus track, 1996)
 "Something So Right" (with Miss Piggy, Kermit & The Muppets) (Muppets Most Wanted, 2014)
 "Somebody Loves Somebody" (Loved Me Back to Life, 2013)
 "Sorry for Love" (A New Day Has Come, 2002)
 "Sorry for Love" (2003 Version) (One Heart, 2003)
 "Soul" (Courage Japanese Bonus Track, 2019)
 "Soul medley: Sex Machine / Soul Man / Lady Marmalade / Sir Duke / Respect / I Got the Feelin' / I Got You (I Feel Good)" (Live) (Taking Chances World Tour: The Concert, 2010)
 "Stand by Your Side" (One Heart, 2003)
 "Super Love" (A New Day Has Come bonus track, 2002)
 "Superwoman" (Diane Warren: The Cave Sessions Vol. 1, 2021)
 "Sur le même bateau" (S'il suffisait d'aimer, 1998)
 "Surprise Surprise" (Taking Chances, 2007)
 "S'il suffisait d'aimer" (S'il suffisait d'aimer, 1998)

T 
 "Taking Chances" (Taking Chances, 2007)
 "Taking Chances" (I-Soul Extended Remix) (Taking Chances, 2007)
 "Tant de temps" (featuring Henri Salvador) (Sans attendre, 2012)
 "Tell Him" (featuring Barbra Streisand) (Let's Talk About Love, 1997)
 "Ten Days" (A New Day Has Come, 2002)
 "Terre" (S'il suffisait d'aimer, 1998)
 "Testimony" (With Miscellenaous artists) (VH1 Divas Live, 1998)
 "Thankful" (Loved Me Back to Life, 2013)
 "Thank You" (Loved Me Back to Life, 2013)
 "That's Just the Woman in Me" (Taking Chances, 2007)
 "That's the Way It Is" (All the Way... A Decade of Song, 1999)
 "That's the Way It Is" (The Metro Club Remix) (My Love: Ultimate Essential Collection bonus track, 2008)
 "The Christmas Song (Chestnuts Roasting on an Open Fire)" (These Are Special Times, 1998)
 "The Chase" (Courage, 2019)
 "The Colour of My Love" (The Colour of My Love, 1993)
 "The First Time Ever I Saw Your Face" (Miracle, 2004)
 "The Greatest Love Of All" (Tribute to Whitney Houston (Grammys),2012 ),
 "The Greatest Reward" (A New Day Has Come, 2002)
 "The Hard Way" (Courage, 2019)
 "The Last to Know" (Unison, 1990)
 "The Magic of Christmas Day (God Bless Us Everyone)" (These Are Special Times, 1998) / (featuring Rosie O'Donnell (A Rosie Christmas, 1999)
 "The Power of Love" (The Colour of My Love, 1993)
 "The Power of the Dream" (It's All Coming Back To Me Now single, 1996)
 "The Prayer" (featuring Andrea Bocelli) (These Are Special Times, 1998)
 "The Reason" (Let's Talk About Love, 1997) / (featuring Carole King, VH1 Divas Live, 1998) / (Backing vocals, Love Makes the World, 2001)
 "The Reason I Go On" (Taking Chances bonus track, 2007)
 "Then You Look at Me" (All the Way... A Decade of Song, 1999)
 "There Comes a Time" (My Love: Essential Collection, 2008)
 "These Are the Special Times" (These Are Special Times, 1998)
 "Think Twice" (The Colour of My Love, 1993)
 "This Time" (Taking Chances, 2007)
 "To Love You More" (The Colour of My Love Japanese re-release bonus track, 1995)
 "To Love You More" (Tony Moran mix) (Let's Talk About Love bonus track, 1997)
 "Todo Para Ti" (With Miscellaneous artists) (What More Can I Give single, 2003)
 "Toi Et Moi" (featuring Charles Aznavour) (Duos, 2008)
 "Tonight we dance (Extravagance!)" (Tycoon, 1992)
 "Tous les blues sont écrits pour toi" (S'il suffisait d'aimer, 1998)
 "Toutes ces choses" (Encore Un Soir, 2016)
 "Tout l'or des hommes" (1 fille & 4 types, 2003)
 "Tout près du bonheur" (featuring Marc Dupré) (Refaire le monde, 2006)
 "Treat Her Like a Lady" (Let's Talk About Love, 1997)
 "Tu nages" (1 fille & 4 types, 2003)
 "Tu sauras" (Encore Un Soir, 2016)

U 
 "Un garçon pas comme les autres (Ziggy)" (Dion chante Plamondon, 1991)
 "Une chance qu'on s'a" (featuring Jean-Pierre Ferland) (Sans attendre, 2012)
 "Unfinished Songs" (From the movie Song for Marion (released in the United States as Unfinished Song) (Loved Me Back to Life,2013)
 "Unison" (Unison, 1990)
 "Unison" (Remix) (Let's Talk About Love bonus track, 1997)
 "Up Where We Belong" (duo avec Paul Baillargeon) (Live) (Céline Dion en concert, 1985)
 "Us" (Let's Talk About Love, 1997)

V 
 "Valse adieu" (1 fille & 4 types, 2003)
 "Va où s'en va l'amour" (Mélanie, 1984)
 "Visa pour les beaux jours" (Tellement j'ai d'amour..., 1982)
 "Vivre et donner" (Les chemins de ma maison, 1983)
 "Voices That Care" (With Miscellaneous artists) (Voices That Care single, 1991)
 "Vole" (D'eux, 1995)
 "Voler" (with Michel Sardou) (Être une femme 2010, 2010)

W 
 "Water and a Flame" (Loved Me Back to Life, 2013)
 "Water from the Moon" (Celine Dion, 1992)
 "What A Wonderful World" (Miracle, 2004)
 "What a Feeling" (Céline Dion en concert, 1985)
 "What More Can I Give" (With Miscellaneous artists) (What More Can I Give single, 2003)
 "When I Fall in Love" (featuring Clive Griffin) (The Colour of My Love, 1993)
 "When I Need You" (Let's Talk About Love, 1997)
 "When the Wrong One Loves You Right" (A New Day Has Come, 2002)
 "Where Does My Heart Beat Now" (Unison, 1990)
 "Where Is the Love" (Let's Talk About Love, 1997)
 "White Christmas" (The Christmas album, 1993)
 "Why Oh Why" (Let's Talk About Love, 1997)
 "Wicked Game - Recorded at Electric Lady Studios, NYC (featuring Chris Isaak) (Spotify Singles, 2020)
 "Wishful Thinking" (featuring Dan Hill) (Real Love, 1989)
 "With This Tear" (Celine Dion, 1992)

Y 
 "Y'a pas de mots" (with Marc Dupré) (Entre Deux Mondes, 2010)
 "(You Make Me Feel Like A) Natural Woman" (Falling into You bonus track, 1996 & With Miscellenaous artists (VH1 Divas Live, 1998))
 "You and I" (A New Day... Live in Las Vegas, 2004)
 "You And Me" (featuring Charles Aznavour) (Duos, 2008)
 "You Shook Me All Night Long" (featuring Anastacia) (VH1 Divas Las Vegas, 2002)
 "Your Light" (Falling into You bonus track, 1996)
 "You've got a friend" (with Shania Twain, Carole King and Gloria Estefan) (VH1 Divas Live, 1998)

Z 
 "Ziggy" (English version of "Un garçon pas comme les autres (Ziggy) ") (Tycoon, 1992)
 "Zora sourit" (S'il suffisait d'aimer, 1998)

Unreleased/unfinished/rare songs
 "Aren't they all our children" (With Miscellaneous artists) (The Concert for World Children's Day DVD, 2002)
 "Ave Maria" (Schubert)
 "Bad"
 "Bozo"
 "Brûle Pas Tes Doigts"
 "Cabaret"
 "Can't Help Falling In Love" (The Colour of My Love Concert Video/DVD, 1995)
 "Can't We Try"
 "Cent Mille Chansons" (featuring Eddy Marnay)
 "C'est Noël"
 "Chain Of Fools"
 "Chante"
 "Chattanooga Choo Choo"
 "Conga" (featuring Gloria Estefan)
 "Dans la main d'un magicien" ("Opération Beurre de pinottes" soundtrack, 1985)
 "Emotion" (with Destiny's Child)
 "Encore Et Encore" (featuring Francis Cabrel)
 "Girls Just Want To Have Fun"
 "Hand in Hand" (German version of Ne partez pas sans moi) (1988)
 "Hard To Say I'm Sorry"
 "Have You Ever Been In Love" (Spanish version) (2002/2003)
 "Hello Mego"
 "Here We Are"
 "Hold On I'm Coming" (featuring Michael Bolton)
 "Hommage A Garou"
 "Hommage A Luc Plamondon"
 "I Finally Found Someone"
 "I Have To Dream" (Children on Their Birthdays DVD, 2002)
 "If You Only Believe"
 "Imagine"
 "I'm Gonna Make You Love Me" (One minute and half long version for The Hudson's Bay commercial)
 "Is Nothing Sacred Anymore"
 "Is This What I Get For Loving You" (unreleased working tape from a Phil Spector production session) (1996) 
 "It's Only Love" (featuring Bryan Adams) (1999)
 "Je N'ai Pas Peur De Mourir Avec Toi"
 "Je Reviendrai A Montréal"
 "Knock On Wood" (featuring Carole Fredericks)
 "La ballade de Michel" (Opération beurre de pinottes soundtrack, 1985) 
 "La Petite Vie"
 "La Souris Verte"
 "La Vie En Rose"
 "Le Petit Roi"
 "L'Envie" (featuring Johnny Hallyday)
 "L'Envie D'aimer"
 "Les Fleurs Malades" (featuring Jean Lapointe)
 "Les Yeux De La Faim" (With Miscellaneous artists) (Les Yeux De La Faim 7, 1985)
 "L'Hymne A L'Amour" 
 "Listen To Me" (featuring Warren Wiebe) (Celebration, 1989) 
 "Listen To The Magic Man" (English version of "Dans la main d'un magicien", The Peanut Butter Solution soundtrack, 1985)
 "L'Ombre S'Enfuit"
 "L'Univers A Besoin D'amour" (1986) / (featuring Paul Baillargeon known as "L'Univers A Besoin D'amour (Version Feux), 1986)
 "Medley Une Colombe/L'Oiseau/Le Temps Qui Court"
 "Memory"
 "Mes ailes à moi" (One-minute-long French version of "You And I ", for Air Canada commercials) 
 "Mes Blues Passent Pu Dans' Porte" (featuring Breen Leboeuf)
 "Michael's Song" (French version of "La ballade de Michel", The Peanut Butter Solution soundtrack, 1985)
 "Mon Ami, Geh Nicht Fort" (German version of "Mon ami m'a quittée") 1984
 "My Heart Belongs To Daddy"
 "My Way"
 "O Canada"
 "Over The Rainbow" (1985) 
 "Papa Don't Preach"
 "Paroles, Paroles" (featuring Alain Delon)
 "Prenez-Moi"
 "Quand Ça Balance"
 "Quand Les Hommes Vivront D'amour"
 "Run Like A River" 
 "Saturday Night's Alright (For Fighting)"
 "Saving All My Love For You"
 "Seulement Qu'une Aventure"
 "Something"
 "Sometimes I Feel Like A Motherless Child"
 "Somewhere"
 "Somos Novios / It's Impossible" (Spanglish duet with Luis Miguel)
 "Sorry Seems To Be The Hardest Word"
 "Stayin’ Alive / You Should Be Dancing" (Au Coeur Du Stade Video/DVD, 1999)
 "Summertime"
 "Tears In Heaven"
 "That's What Friends Are For"
 "The Best"
 "The Greatest Love Of All"
 "The Show Must Go On" (Performed during the Taking Chances World Tour)
 "The Star Spangled Banner"
 "Ton Fils"
 "Ton Visage"
 "Tonight I’ll See the Morning With Him" (unreleased working tape from a Phil Spector production session) (1996) 
 "Twist And Shout" (Celine Dion... Live in Memphis Video), 1997)
 "Un Jour Un Enfant"
 "Un Pays Pour Nous"
 "Une Chance Qu'on S'a" (featuring Jean-Pierre Ferland)
 "Vois comme c'est beau" (featuring Claudette Dion) (Hymnes à l’amour, vol. 2, 1985)
 "Was Bedeute Ich Dir" (German version of "D'amour ou d'amitié ") 1984
 "What Am I to Do" (unreleased working tape from a Phil Spector production session) (1996) 
 "What I Did For Love"
 "When You're Gone" (featuring Bryan Adams) (1999)
 "Wind Beneath My Wings"
 "With One More Look At You/Watch Closely Now"
 "Would I Know"

External links
Official website

Dion, Celine